The Crush is a 1993 American psychological thriller film written and directed by Alan Shapiro, which stars Cary Elwes as Nick Eliot and Alicia Silverstone as Darian Forrester, in her feature film debut. When 28-year-old writer Nick Eliot moves to a new city for a magazine job, Darian Forrester, the 14-year-old daughter of the landlords whose guesthouse he rents, instantly makes her attraction to Nick clear. However, while Nick romances photographer Amy Maddik at work, he has trouble fending off Darian's advances. As her obsession with Nick grows, Darian becomes angry at being rejected and starts attacking his property and friends, even going as far as having him arrested for sexual assault. It was filmed on location from September 24 to November 20, 1992, in Vancouver, British Columbia, Canada. The movie quickly became a cult classic. It also influenced other thriller and suspense movies of the 90s and 2000s.

Plot
Twenty-eight-year-old writer Nick Eliot (Cary Elwes) secures a job at Pique magazine and lodging in a guest house belonging to Cliff and Liv Forrester. The handsome Nick soon becomes acquainted with and frequently visited by the couple's 14-year-old daughter Darian (Alicia Silverstone) a precocious girl who becomes intensely infatuated with him.

Darian invites Nick to a party that her parents are throwing at their house. Without confirming that he will attend, Nick decides to stop in. As he enters the house, Nick is taken by Darian's impressive piano performance. Nick follows Darian to her parents' outdoor balcony afterwards. He muses that if she were just 10 years older, as she flirtatiously interrupts him, questioning what he'd do. Redirecting the conversation, Darian suddenly encourages Nick to take her for a ride in his convertible. Nick agrees to drive Darian to a place of her choosing; a romantic secluded area where she attempts to kiss him. Though initially receptive to the kiss, Nick stops when he realizes he is being seduced. Without leading her on, Nick takes Darian home. 
 
Darian's crush on Nick intensifies, but he quickly wises up and attempts to put her off. He begins a budding romance with coworker Amy. Darian continues to boldly pursue him, sneaking into his room to rewrite his article (which impresses his boss) and even going so far as to undress in front of him when he accidentally hides in her closet. When Nick continues to rebuff her advances, Darian's actions become destructive; she steals his favorite childhood photo, defaces a car he has restored, and erases his computer discs, yet he's unable to convince her parents of her guilt. Cheyenne, a friend of Darian's, tries to warn Nick about her, but she has an "accident" at the riding school she and Darian attend together when Darian sabotages the saddle on her horse. After Darian spies on Nick in bed with Amy, she locks Amy in her darkroom and empties a wasps' nest into the vents, exploiting Amy's spheksophobia. Amy survives, and Nick, now convinced that Darian is big trouble, attempts to find new lodging. However, Darian accuses him of sexually assaulting her with "evidence" obtained from a used condom from Nick's trash; he is subsequently arrested. After Michael bails him out (and suspends him until trial), Cheyenne tells Nick that she knows he is innocent and that Darian has an extensive history of obsessive behavior, citing a previous crush on a camp counselor named Rick who "accidentally" died from eating something poisonous. Cheyenne also informs Nick of a diary Darian kept that can exonerate him.

After Cheyenne departs, Nick hears strange noises coming from the Forresters' house. He investigates and finds Cheyenne bound and gagged on the carousel in the attic. Darian confronts and attacks him, leading Cliff to attack Nick after he mistakes him for the aggressor. Darian then knocks Cliff unconscious in defense of Nick, enabling the latter to subdue her with one punch. Acquitted, Nick goes to live with Amy in Seattle while Darian is confined to a psychiatric hospital in Spanaway. Though she laments that Nick refuses to speak to her, respond to the multiple letters she has written, or accept her apologies, her doctor comments that she is making good progress, unaware that she is now developing a crush on him. In the final scene, Darian returns to her room in the hospital, where she glares at a photo of the doctor and his wife before her mouth slowly curves into a devious smile.

Cast
 Cary Elwes as Nicholas "Nick" Eliot
 Alicia Silverstone as Adrian/Darian Forrester
 Jennifer Rubin as Amy Maddik
 Kurtwood Smith as Cliff Forrester
 Gwynyth Walsh as Liv Forrester
 Amber Benson as Cheyenne
 Matthew Walker as Michael

Lawsuit and character name change
Writer and director Alan Shapiro based the film on events from his own life. The girl on whom he based Adrian sued him for using her real name, Darian, for Alicia Silverstone's character. As a result, when the film was re-edited for TV, the character's name was changed from Darian to Adrian. Silverstone is still credited as having played Darian Forrester on IMDb.
The VHS and laser disc releases retained the original spoken dialogue that called the character Darian. The original theatrical trailer also refers to the character as Darian.

Reception
On Rotten Tomatoes, it has a 24% rating from critics based on 29 reviews. Audiences polled by CinemaScore gave the film an average grade of "C+" on an A+ to F scale.

References

External links
 
 
 
 

1993 films
1993 directorial debut films
1993 drama films
1993 thriller films
1990s English-language films
1990s erotic thriller films
1990s psychological thriller films
1990s teen drama films
American erotic thriller films
American films about revenge
American psychological thriller films
American teen drama films
Films about stalking
Films about writers
Films scored by Graeme Revell
Films set in Seattle
Films shot in Vancouver
Juvenile sexuality in films
Morgan Creek Productions films
Teen thriller films
Thriller films based on actual events
Warner Bros. films
1990s American films